Copromorpha phaeosticta is a moth in the Copromorphidae family. It is found in Australia, where it has been recorded from Queensland.

The wingspan is about 15 mm. The forewings are grey-whitish, strigulated with fuscous. There are a number of fuscous dots on the costa and there is a transverse ridge of elevated scales from the dorsum nearly to the costa. The hindwings are pale-grey.

References

Natural History Museum Lepidoptera generic names catalog

Copromorphidae
Moths described in 1916